TekurPeta is a small village in Kadapa district of the Indian state of Andhra Pradesh. The nationally famous turmeric variety tekurpeta is planted here . It is located in Porumamilla mandal of Rajampeta revenue division.

Education facilities 

There is an elementary school in Tekuru Peta. Zilla Parishad High School is a high school for studying high school

Medical facilities 

  The village has a primary health center for healing

References 

1.Socal welfare report of TekurPeta hostels Tekurpeta village

Villages in Kadapa district